D. W. B. and Julia Waddell Tevis House is a historic home located at Lexington, Lafayette County, Missouri. It was built around 1868 and is a two-story, cruciform plan, and Italianate style brick dwelling. It features a roofline embellished with hefty modillions (or mini-brackets) and twin Queen Anne porches. Also on the property is the contributing small, frame outbuilding.

It was listed on the National Register of Historic Places in 1993.

References

Houses on the National Register of Historic Places in Missouri
Italianate architecture in Missouri
Queen Anne architecture in Missouri
Houses completed in 1868
Houses in Lafayette County, Missouri
National Register of Historic Places in Lafayette County, Missouri